The Frederick Isaac and Mary M. Jones House is a historic house in Monticello, Utah. It was built in 1896 for Frederick Isaac Jones, a member of the Church of Jesus Christ of Latter-day Saints from Cedar City, Utah who moved to Montecillo with his wife Mary as a settler. Jones served as the local bishop for 25 years. His house was designed in the Gothic Revival and Victorian Eclectic styles. It has been listed on the National Register of Historic Places since August 14, 2003.

References

National Register of Historic Places in San Juan County, Utah
Gothic Revival architecture in Utah
Houses completed in 1896
1896 establishments in Utah